"Asphalt Risin'" is Fu Manchu's fifth single. It was released in 1996 by Mammoth Records. "Asphalt Risin'" is the first of two single releases off the album In Search Of....

Track listing 
 "Asphalt Risin'" - 3:11
 "Chevy Van"; originally written and performed by Sammy Johns. It was the soundtrack to the 70s teenflick The Van.

Fu Manchu (band) songs
1996 songs